The Tour of China is an annual professional road bicycle racing stage race held in China since 1995. The race is sanctioned by the International Cycling Union (UCI) as a 2.1 category race as part of the UCI Asia Tour.

Since 2012, there are two parts of the Tour of China, Tour of China I and Tour of China II.

Past winners

Tour of China

Tour of China I

Tour of China II

External links
 

Tour of China I
 
 Statistics at the-sports.org
 Tour of China I at cqranking.com

Tour of China II
 
 Statistics at the-sports.org
 Tour of China II at cqranking.com

Cycle races in China
UCI Asia Tour races
Recurring sporting events established in 1995
1995 establishments in China
Autumn events in China